Uppunuthala or Uppununthala is a Mandal in Naagar kurnool district, Telangana, India.

Institutions
 Zilla Parishad High School
 Guvvalonipally car
 Kamsanipally 	
 Koratikal 	
 Laxmapoor (pg) 	
 Mamillapally 	
 Marripally 	
 Peddapur
 Penimella 	
 Pertiwanipally 	
 Sadgodu 	
 Tadoor 	
 Upparipally 	
 Uppununthala 	
 Veltoor
ZPTC - ANANTHA PRATAP REDDY

Mandals in Nagarkurnool district